Steve Hurst (born c. 1948) is an American politician. He is a member of the Alabama House of Representatives from the 35th District, serving since 1998. He is a member of the Republican party.

Hurst put forward a bill that, if approved, would require sex offenders who are 21 years of age or older, and committed a sexual offense against a child 12 years of age or younger, to undergo permanent surgical castration before being released from custody. According to Sputnik, "only 7 states allow voluntary chemical castration as a replacement to imprisonment of those convicted of sexual offenses, and Texas is the only state that currently allows certain repeat offenders to elect surgical castration."

References

Living people
Republican Party members of the Alabama House of Representatives
1940s births
21st-century American politicians